Trillium recurvatum, the prairie trillium, toadshade, or bloody butcher, is a species of perennial herbaceous flowering plant in the family Melanthiaceae. It is native to parts of central and eastern United States, where it is found from Iowa south to Texas and east to North Carolina and Pennsylvania. It grows in mesic forests and savannas, often in calcareous soils. It is also known as bloody noses, red trillium, prairie wake-robin, purple trillium, and reflexed trillium, in reference to its reflexed sepals.

Description

The sepals are recurved, pointing downwards when the flower has fully opened. The stigmas are recurved at the tips. It is distinguished from other sessile-flowered Trillium species, such as Trillium sessile, by its reflexed sepals.

The fruit is green, sometimes streaked with purple or white, with six well-developed ridges. The seeds have an oil-rich structure called an elaiosome, which promotes dispersal by ants and other foraging insects.

Conservation
Trillium recurvatum is common throughout much of its range. It is not considered to be globally threatened, and its status is considered secure. However, it is monitored by conservation agencies in several states at the edge of its range, where it becomes rare. For example, in Wisconsin it is considered rare or uncommon (S3) and therefore a species of special concern. In Michigan, it is considered a state threatened species and is protected by law.

References

External links
 
 

recurvatum
Endemic flora of the United States
Ephemeral plants
Plants described in 1826